The Sierra de Perijá white-fronted capuchin (Cebus leucocephalus) is a species of gracile capuchin monkey from Colombia and Venezuela.  It had formerly been regarded as a subspecies of the Humboldt's white-fronted capuchin but was reclassified by Mittermeier and Rylands as a separate species in 2013, based on genetic studies by Jean Boubli.

The range of the Sierra de Perijá white-fronted capuchin is restricted to the forests in a portion of northern Colombia and northwest Venezuela.

References

Capuchin monkeys
Mammals of Colombia
Mammals of Venezuela
Primates of South America
Mammals described in 1866
Taxa named by John Edward Gray